The 20th (twentieth) century began on

January 1, 1901 (MCMI), and ended on December 31, 2000 (MM). The 20th century was dominated by significant events that defined the modern era: the sixth mass extinction, Spanish flu pandemic, World War I and World War II, nuclear weapons, nuclear power and space exploration, nationalism and decolonization, the Cold War and post-Cold War conflicts, and technological advances. These reshaped the political and social structure of the globe.

Additional themes include intergovernmental organizations and cultural homogenization through developments in emerging transportation and communications technology; poverty reduction and rising standards of living, world population growth, awareness of environmental degradation, ecological extinction; and the beginning of the Digital Revolution. Automobiles, airplanes and the use of home appliances became common, as did video and audio recording. Great advances in power generation, communication, and medical technology allowed for near-instantaneous worldwide computer communication and genetic modification of life.

The repercussions of the World Wars, the Cold War, and globalization crafted a world where people are more united than any previous time in human history, as exemplified by the establishment of international law, international aid, and the United Nations. The Marshall Plan—which spent $13 billion ($ billion in  U.S. dollars) to rebuild the economies of post-war nations—launched "Pax Americana". Throughout the latter half of the 20th century, the rivalry between the United States and the Soviet Union created enormous tensions around the world which manifested in various armed proxy regional conflicts and the omnipresent danger of nuclear proliferation. The dissolution of the Soviet Union in 1991 after the collapse of its European alliance was heralded by capitalists as the end of communism, though by the century's end roughly one in six people on Earth lived under communist rule, mostly in China which was rapidly rising as an economic and geopolitical power.

It took over two hundred thousand years of modern human history and 6 million years of human evolution for the world's population to reach 1 billion in 1804. During the 20th century, world population had reached an estimated 2 billion in 1927, and by late 2000, the global population had reached 6 billion, with over half in East, South and Southeast Asia. Global literacy averaged 80%. Penicillin and other medical breakthroughs, combined with the World Health Organization's global vaccination campaigns, yielded unprecedented results, helping to eradicate smallpox and other diseases responsible for more human deaths than all wars and natural disasters combined; smallpox now only existed in labs. Machines came to be used in all areas of production, feeding increasingly intricate supply chains that allowed mankind for the first time to be constrained not by how much it could produce, but by peoples' willingness to consume. Trade improvements greatly expanded upon the limited set of food-producing techniques used since the Neolithic period, multiplying the diversity of foods available and boosting the quality of human nutrition. Until the early 19th century, life expectancy from birth was about thirty in most populations; global lifespan-averages exceeded 40 years for the first time in history, with over half achieving 70 or more years (three decades longer than a century earlier).

Overview

Chronological history
The 20th (twentieth) century began on

January 1, 1901, and ended on December 31, 2000. It was the tenth and final century of the 2nd millennium. Unlike most century years, the year 2000 was a leap year, and the second century leap year in the Gregorian calendar after 1600.

The century had the first global-scale total wars between world powers across continents and oceans in World War I and World War II. Nationalism became a major political issue in the world in the 20th century, acknowledged in international law along with the right of nations to self-determination, official decolonization in the mid-century, and related regional conflicts.

The century saw a major shift in the way that many people lived, with changes in politics, ideology, economics, society, culture, science, technology, and medicine. The 20th century may have seen more technological and scientific progress than all the other centuries combined since the dawn of civilization. Terms like nationalism, globalism, environmentalism, ideology, world war, genocide, and nuclear war entered common usage. Scientific discoveries, such as the theory of relativity and quantum physics, profoundly changed the foundational models of physical science, forcing scientists to realize that the universe was more complex than previously believed, and dashing the hopes (or fears) at the end of the 19th century that the last few details of scientific knowledge were about to be filled in. It was a century that started with horses, simple automobiles, and freighters but ended with high-speed rail, cruise ships, global commercial air travel and the Space Shuttle. Horses and other pack animals, every society's basic form of personal transportation for thousands of years, were replaced by automobiles and buses within a few decades. These developments were made possible by the exploitation of fossil fuel resources, which offered energy in an easily portable form, but also caused concern about pollution and long-term impact on the environment. Humans explored space for the first time, taking their first footsteps on the Moon.

Mass media, telecommunications, and information technology (especially computers, paperback books, public education, and the Internet) made the world's knowledge more widely available. Public health improvements led to global life expectancy increasing from 35 years to 65 years. Rapid technological advancements, however, also allowed warfare to reach unprecedented levels of destruction. World War II alone killed over 60 million people, while nuclear weapons gave humankind the means to annihilate itself in a short time. However, these same wars resulted in the destruction of the imperial system. For the first time in human history, empires and their wars of expansion and colonization ceased to be a factor in international affairs, resulting in a far more globalized and cooperative world. The last time major powers clashed openly was in 1945, and since then, violence has seen an unprecedented decline.

The world also became more culturally homogenized than ever with developments in transportation and communications technology, popular music and other influences of Western culture, international corporations, and what was arguably a truly global economy by the end of the 20th century.

Summary
At the beginning of the period, the British Empire was the world's most powerful nation, having acted as the world's policeman for the past century.

Technological advancements during World War I changed the way war was fought, as new inventions such as tanks, chemical weapons, and aircraft modified tactics and strategy. After more than four years of trench warfare in Western Europe, and up to 22 million dead, the powers that had formed the Triple Entente (France, Britain, and Russia, later replaced by the United States and joined by Italy and Romania) emerged victorious over the Central Powers (Germany, Austria-Hungary, the Ottoman Empire and Bulgaria). In addition to annexing many of the colonial possessions of the vanquished states, the Triple Entente exacted punitive restitution payments from them, plunging Germany in particular into economic depression. The Austro-Hungarian and Ottoman empires were dismantled at the war's conclusion. The Russian Revolution resulted in the overthrow of the Tsarist regime of Nicholas II and the onset of the Russian Civil War. The victorious Bolsheviks then established the Soviet Union, the world's first communist state.

Fascism, a movement which grew out of post-war angst and which accelerated during the Great Depression of the 1930s, gained momentum in Italy, Germany, and Spain in the 1920s and 1930s, culminating in World War II, sparked by Nazi Germany's aggressive expansion at the expense of its neighbors. Meanwhile, Japan had rapidly transformed itself into a technologically advanced industrial power and, along with Germany and Italy, formed the Axis powers. Japan's military expansionism in East Asia and the Pacific Ocean brought it into conflict with the United States, culminating in a surprise attack which drew the US into World War II.

After some years of dramatic military success, Germany was defeated in 1945, having been invaded by the Soviet Union and Poland from the East and by the United States, the United Kingdom, Canada, and France from the West. After the victory of the Allies in Europe, the war in Asia ended with the Soviet invasion of Manchuria and the dropping of two atomic bombs on Japan by the US, the first nation to develop nuclear weapons and the only one to use them in warfare. In total, World War II left some 60 million people dead.

Following World War II, the United Nations, successor to the League of Nations, was established as an international forum in which the world's nations could discuss issues diplomatically. It enacted resolutions on such topics as the conduct of warfare, environmental protection, international sovereignty, and human rights. Peacekeeping forces consisting of troops provided by various countries, with various United Nations and other aid agencies, helped to relieve famine, disease, and poverty, and to suppress some local armed conflicts. Europe slowly united, economically and, in some ways, politically, to form the European Union, which consisted of 15 European countries by the end of the 20th century.

After the war, Germany was occupied and divided between the Western powers and the Soviet Union. East Germany and the rest of Eastern Europe became Soviet puppet states under communist rule. Western Europe was rebuilt with the aid of the American Marshall Plan, resulting in a major post-war economic boom, and many of the affected nations became close allies of the United States.

With the Axis defeated and Britain and France rebuilding, the United States and the Soviet Union were left standing as the world's only superpowers. Allies during the war, they soon became hostile to one another as their competing ideologies of communism and democratic capitalism proliferated in Europe, which became divided by the Iron Curtain and the Berlin Wall. They formed competing military alliances (NATO and the Warsaw Pact) which engaged in a decades-long standoff known as the Cold War. The period was marked by a new arms race as the USSR became the second nation to develop nuclear weapons, which were produced by both sides in sufficient numbers to end most human life on the planet had a large-scale nuclear exchange ever occurred. Mutually assured destruction is credited by many historians as having prevented such an exchange, each side being unable to strike first at the other without ensuring an equally devastating retaliatory strike. Unable to engage one another directly, the conflict played out in a series of proxy wars around the world—particularly in China, Korea, Cuba, Vietnam, and Afghanistan—as the USSR sought to export communism while the US attempted to contain it. The technological competition between the two sides led to substantial investment in research and development which produced innovations that reached far beyond the battlefield, such as space exploration and the Internet.

In the latter half of the century, most of the European-colonized world in Africa and Asia gained independence in a process of decolonization. Meanwhile, globalization opened the door for several nations to exert a strong influence over many world affairs. The US's global military presence spread American culture around the world with the advent of the Hollywood motion picture industry and Broadway, jazz, rock music, and pop music, fast food and hippy counterculture, hip-hop, house music, and disco, as well as street style, all of which came to be identified with the concepts of popular culture and youth culture. After the Soviet Union collapsed under internal pressure in 1991, most of the communist governments it had supported around the world were dismantled—with the notable exceptions of China, North Korea, Cuba, Vietnam, and Laos—followed by awkward transitions into market economies.

Nature of innovation and change 
Due to continuing industrialization and expanding trade, many significant changes of the century were, directly or indirectly, economic and technological in nature. Inventions such as the light bulb, the automobile, and the telephone in the late 19th century, followed by supertankers, airliners, motorways, radio, television, air conditioning, antibiotics, nuclear power, frozen food, computers and microcomputers, the Internet, and mobile telephones affected people's quality of life across the developed world. The quantity of goods consumed by the average person expanded massively. Scientific research, engineering professionalization and technological development—much of it motivated by the Cold War arms race—drove changes in everyday life.

Social change 

At the beginning of the century, strong discrimination based on race and sex was significant in most societies. Although the Atlantic slave trade had ended in the 19th century, movements for equality for non-white people in the white-dominated societies of North America, Europe, and South Africa continued. By the end of the 20th century, in many parts of the world, women had the same legal rights as men, and racism had come to be seen as unacceptable, a sentiment often backed up by legislation. When the Republic of India was constituted, the disadvantaged classes of the caste system in India became entitled to affirmative action benefits in education, employment and government.

Attitudes toward pre-marital sex changed rapidly in many societies during the sexual revolution of the 1960s and 1970s. Attitudes towards homosexuality also began to change in the later part of the century.

Earth at the end of the 20th century 
Economic growth and technological progress had radically altered daily lives. Europe appeared to be at a sustainable peace for the first time in recorded history. The people of the Indian subcontinent, a sixth of the world population at the end of the 20th century, had attained an indigenous independence for the first time in centuries. China, an ancient nation comprising a fifth of the world population, was finally open to the world, creating a new state after the near-complete destruction of the old cultural order. With the end of colonialism and the Cold War, nearly a billion people in Africa were left in new nation states.

The world was undergoing its second major period of globalization; the first, which started in the 18th century, having been terminated by World War I. Since the US was in a dominant position, a major part of the process was Americanization. The influence of China and India was also rising, as the world's largest populations were rapidly integrating with the world economy.

Terrorism, dictatorship, and the spread of nuclear weapons were pressing global issues. The world was still blighted by small-scale wars and other violent conflicts, fueled by competition over resources and by ethnic conflicts.

Disease threatened to destabilize many regions of the world. New viruses such as the West Nile virus continued to spread. Malaria and other diseases affected large populations. Millions were infected with HIV, the virus which causes AIDS. The virus was becoming an epidemic in southern Africa.

Based on research done by climate scientists, the majority of the scientific community consider that in the long term environmental problems pose a serious threat. One argument is that of global warming occurring due to human-caused emission of greenhouse gases, particularly carbon dioxide produced by the burning of fossil fuels. This prompted many nations to negotiate and sign the Kyoto treaty, which set mandatory limits on carbon dioxide emissions.

World population increased from about 1.6 billion people in 1901 to 6.1 billion at the century's end.

Wars and politics 

The number of people killed during the century by government actions was in the hundreds of millions. This includes deaths caused by wars, genocide, politicide and mass murders. The deaths from acts of war during the two world wars alone have been estimated at between 50 and 80 million. Political scientist Rudolph Rummel estimated 262,000,000 deaths caused by democide, which excludes those killed in war battles, civilians unintentionally killed in war and killings of rioting mobs. According to Charles Tilly, "Altogether, about 100 million people died as a direct result of action by organized military units backed by one government or another over the course of the century. Most likely a comparable number of civilians died of war-induced disease and other indirect effects." It is estimated that approximately 70 million Europeans died through war, violence and famine between 1914 and 1945.
 The Armenian, Syriac and Greek genocide were the systematic destruction, mass murder and expulsion of the Armenians, Assyrians and Greeks in the Ottoman Empire during World War I, spearheaded by the ruling Committee of Union and Progress (CUP).
 Rising nationalism and increasing national awareness were among the many causes of World War I (1914–1918), the first of two wars to involve many major world powers including Germany, France, Italy, Japan, Russia/USSR, the British Empire and the United States. World War I led to the creation of many new countries, especially in Eastern Europe. At the time, it was said by many to be the "war to end all wars".
 During World War I, in the Russian Revolution of 1917, 300 years of Tsarist reign were ended and the Bolsheviks, under the leadership of Vladimir Lenin, established the world's first Communist state. 
 After gaining political rights in the United States and much of Europe in the first part of the century, and with the advent of new birth control techniques, women became more independent throughout the century.
 Industrial warfare greatly increased in its scale and complexity during the first half of the 20th century. Notable developments included chemical warfare, the introduction of military aviation and the widespread use of submarines. The introduction of nuclear warfare in the mid-20th century marked the definite transition to modern warfare.
 The Revolutions of 1917-1923 occurred during and World War I inspired by the Russian Revolution which saw many politcal changes in Europe and in Asia.
 The Great Depression in the 1930s led to the rise of Fascism and Nazism in Europe.
 A violent civil war broke out in Spain in 1936 when General Francisco Franco rebelled against the Second Spanish Republic. Many consider this war as a testing battleground for World War II, as the fascist armies bombed some Spanish territories.
 World War II (1939–1945) became the deadliest conflict in human history involving primarily the axis, Nazi Germany, Facist Italy, and the Empire of Japan, against the allies, China, France, the United Kingdom, the Soviet Union, and the United States. Many atrocities occurred, particularly the Holocaust killing approximately 11 million victims. It ended with the atomic bombings on Hiroshima and Nagasaki in Japan.
 The two world wars led to efforts to increase international cooperation, notably through the founding of the League of Nations after World War I, and its successor, the United Nations, after World War II.
 The creation of Israel in 1948, a Jewish state in the Middle East, at the end of the British Mandate for Palestine, fueled many regional conflicts. These were also influenced by the vast oil fields in many of the other countries of the predominantly Arab region.
 After the Soviet Union's involvement in World War II, communism became a major force in global politics, notably in Eastern Europe, China, Indochina and Cuba, where communist parties gained near-absolute power. 

 The Cold War (1947–1989) involved an arms race and increasing competition between the two major players in the world: the Soviet Union and the United States. This competition included the development and improvement of nuclear weapons and the Space Race. This led to the proxy wars with the Western bloc, including wars in Korea (1950–1953) and Vietnam (1957–1975).
 The Soviet authorities caused the deaths of millions of their own citizens to eliminate domestic opposition. More than 18 million people passed through the Gulag, with a further 6 million being exiled to remote areas of the Soviet Union.
 Nationalist movements in the Indian subcontinent led to the independence and partition of Jawaharlal Nehru-led India and Muhammad Ali Jinnah-led Pakistan.
 After a long period of civil wars and conflicts with western powers, China's last imperial dynasty ended in 1912. The resulting republic was replaced, after another civil war, by a communist People's Republic of China in 1949. At the end of the 20th century, though still ruled by a communist party, China's economic system had largely transformed to capitalism.
 Mahatma Gandhi's nonviolence and Indian independence movement against the British Empire influenced many political movements around the world, including the civil rights movement in the United States, and freedom movements in South Africa against apartheid challenging racial segregation 
 The end of colonialism led to the independence of many African and Asian countries. During the Cold War, many of these aligned with the United States, the USSR, or China for defense.

 The Great Chinese Famine was a direct cause of the death of tens of millions of Chinese peasants between 1959 and 1962. It is thought to be the largest famine in human history.
 The Vietnam War caused two million deaths, changed the dynamics between the Eastern and Western Blocs, and altered global North-South relations.
 The Soviet War in Afghanistan caused one million deaths and contributed to the dissolution of the Soviet Union and complete politcal turmoil in Afghanistan
 The revolutions of 1989 released Eastern and Central Europe from Soviet supremacy. Soon thereafter, the Soviet Union, Czechoslovakia, and Yugoslavia dissolved, the latter violently over several years, into successor states, many rife with ethnic nationalism. Meanwhile, East Germany and West Germany were reunified in 1990.
 The Tiananmen Square protests of 1989, culminating in the deaths of hundreds of civilian protesters, were a series of demonstrations in and near Tiananmen Square in Beijing, China. Led mainly by students and intellectuals, the protests occurred in a year that saw the collapse of a number of communist governments around the world.
 European integration began in earnest in the 1950s, and eventually led to the European Union, a political and economic union that comprised 15 countries at the end of the 20th century.

Culture and entertainment 

 As the century began, Paris was the artistic capital of the world, where both French and foreign writers, composers and visual artists gathered. By the middle of the century New York City had become the artistic capital of the world.
 Theater, films, music and the media had a major influence on fashion and trends in all aspects of life. As many films and much music originate from the United States, American culture spread rapidly over the world.
 1953 saw the coronation of Queen Elizabeth II, an iconic figure of the century.
 Visual culture became more dominant not only in films but in comics and television as well. During the century a new skilled understanding of narrativist imagery was developed.
 Computer games and internet surfing became new and popular form of entertainment during the last 25 years of the century.
 In literature, science fiction, fantasy (with well-developed fictional worlds, rich in detail), and alternative history fiction gained popularity. Detective fiction gained popularity in the interwar period. In the United States in 1961 Grove Press published Tropic of Cancer a novel by Henry Miller redefining pornography and censorship in publishing in America.

Music

The invention of music recording technologies such as the phonograph record, and dissemination technologies such as radio broadcasting, massively expanded the audience for music. Prior to the 20th century, music was generally only experienced in live performances. Many new genres of music were established during the 20th century.
 Igor Stravinsky revolutionized classical composition.
 In the 1920s, Arnold Schoenberg developed the twelve-tone technique, which became widely influential on 20th-century composers.
 In classical music, composition branched out into many completely new domains, including dodecaphony, aleatoric (chance) music, and minimalism.
 Tango was created in Argentina and became extremely popular in the rest of the Americas and Europe.
 Blues and jazz music became popularized during the 1910s, 1920s and 1930s in the United States. Bebop develops as a form of jazz in the 1940s.
 Country music develops in the 1920s and 1930s in the United States.
 Blues and country went on to influence rock and roll in the 1950s, which along with folk music, increased in popularity with the British Invasion of the mid-to-late 1960s.
 Rock soon branched into many different genres, including folk rock, heavy metal, punk rock, and alternative rock and became the dominant genre of popular music.
 This was challenged with the rise of hip hop in the 1980s and 1990s.
 Other genres such as house, techno, reggae, and soul all developed during the latter half of the century and went through various periods of popularity.
 Synthesizers began to be employed widely in music and crossed over into the mainstream with new wave music in the 1980s. Electronic instruments have been widely deployed in all manners of popular music and has led to the development of such genres as house, synth-pop, electronic dance music, and industrial.

Film, television and theatre

Film as an artistic medium was created in the 20th century. The first modern movie theatre was established in Pittsburgh in 1905. Hollywood developed as the center of American film production. While the first films were in black and white, technicolor was developed in the 1920s to allow for color films. Sound films were developed, with the first full-length feature film, The Jazz Singer, released in 1927. The Academy Awards were established in 1929. Animation was also developed in the 1920s, with the first full-length cel animated feature film Snow White and the Seven Dwarfs, released in 1937. Computer-generated imagery was developed in the 1980s, with the first full-length CGI-animated film Toy Story released in 1995.
 Julie Andrews, Harry Belafonte, Humphrey Bogart, Marlon Brando, James Cagney, Charlie Chaplin, Sean Connery, Tom Cruise, James Dean, Robert De Niro, Harrison Ford, Clark Gable, Cary Grant, Audrey Hepburn, Katharine Hepburn, Bruce Lee, Marilyn Monroe, Paul Newman, Jack Nicholson, Al Pacino, Sidney Poitier, Meryl Streep, Elizabeth Taylor, James Stewart, Jane Fonda and John Wayne are among the most popular Hollywood stars of the 20th century.
 Madhubala, Jean-Paul Belmondo, Karel Roden, Sean Connery, Marcello Mastroianni, Salah Zulfikar, Marlene Dietrich, Brigitte Bardot, Omar Sharif, Catherine Deneuve, Alain Delon, Soad Hosny, Fernanda Montenegro, Sophie Marceau, Fatima Rushdi, Amitabh Bachchan, Jean Gabin, Toshiro Mifune, Shoukry Sarhan, Lars Mikkelsen, Sophia Loren, Youssef Wahbi, Claudia Cardinale, Klaus Kinski, Gérard Depardieu, Max von Sydow, Faten Hamama, Rutger Hauer and Toni Servillo are among the most popular movie stars of the 20th century. 
 Sergei Eisenstein, D. W. Griffith, Cecil B. DeMille, Frank Capra, Howard Hawks, John Ford, Orson Welles, Martin Scorsese, John Huston, Alfred Hitchcock, Akira Kurosawa, Spike Lee, Ingmar Bergman, Federico Fellini, Walt Disney, Stanley Kubrick, Steven Spielberg, Ridley Scott, Woody Allen, Quentin Tarantino, James Cameron, William Friedkin, Ezz El-Dine Zulficar and George Lucas are among the most important and popular filmmakers of the 20th century.
 In theater, sometimes referred to as Broadway in New York City, playwrights such as Eugene O'Neill, Samuel Beckett, Edward Albee, Arthur Miller and Tennessee Williams introduced innovative language and ideas to the idiom. In musical theater, figures such as Rodgers and Hammerstein, Lerner and Loewe, Mohammed Karim, and Irving Berlin had an enormous impact on both film and the culture in general.
 Modern dance is born in America as a 'rebellion' against centuries-old European ballet. Dancers and choreographers Alvin Ailey, Isadora Duncan, Vaslav Nijinsky, Ruth St. Denis, Mahmoud Reda, Martha Graham, José Limón, Doris Humphrey, Merce Cunningham, and Paul Taylor re-defined movement, struggling to bring it back to its 'natural' roots and along with Jazz, created a solely American art form. Alvin Ailey is credited with popularizing modern dance and revolutionizing African-American participation in 20th-century concert dance. His company gained the nickname "Cultural Ambassador to the World" because of its extensive international touring. Ailey's choreographic masterpiece Revelations is believed to be the best known and most often seen modern dance performance.

Video games

Video games—due to the great technological steps forward in computing since the second post-war period—are one of the new forms of entertainment that emerged in the 20th century alongside films.
 While already conceptualized in the 1940s–50s, video games only emerged as an industry during the 1970s, and then exploded into social and cultural phenomena such as the golden age of arcade video games, with notable releases such as Taito's Space Invaders, Atari's Asteroids, Nintendo's Donkey Kong, Namco's Pac-Man and Galaga, Konami's Frogger, Capcom's 1942 and Sega's Zaxxon, the worldwide success of Nintendo's Super Mario Bros. and the release in the 1990s of Sony PlayStation console, the first one to break the record of 100 million units sold, with Gran Turismo being the system's best selling video game.
 Video game design becomes a discipline. Some game designers in this century stand out for their work, such as Shigeru Miyamoto, Hideo Kojima, Sid Meier and Will Wright.

Art and architecture

 The art world experienced the development of new styles and explorations such as fauvism, expressionism, Dadaism, cubism, de stijl, surrealism, abstract expressionism, color field, pop art, minimal art, lyrical abstraction, and conceptual art.
 The modern art movement revolutionized art and culture and set the stage for both Modernism and its counterpart postmodern art as well as other contemporary art practices.
 Art Nouveau began as a form of architecture and design but fell out of fashion after World War I. The style was dynamic and inventive but unsuited to the depression of the Great War.
 In Europe, modern architecture departed from the decorated styles of the Victorian era. Streamlined forms inspired by machines became commonplace, enabled by developments in building materials and technologies. Before World War II, many European architects moved to the United States, where modern architecture continued to develop.
 The automobile increased the mobility of people in the Western countries in the early-to-mid-century, and in many other places by the end of the 20th century. City design throughout most of the West became focused on transport via car.

Sport
 The popularity of sport increased considerably—both as an activity for all, and as entertainment, particularly on television.
 The modern Olympic Games, first held in 1896, grew to include tens of thousands of athletes in dozens of sports.
 The FIFA World Cup was first held in 1930, and was held every four years after World War II.

Science

Mathematics 

Multiple new fields of mathematics were developed in the 20th century. In the first part of the 20th century, measure theory, functional analysis, and topology were established, and significant developments were made in fields such as abstract algebra and probability. The development of set theory and formal logic led to Gödel's incompleteness theorems.

Later in the 20th century, the development of computers led to the establishment of a theory of computation. Computationally-intense results include the study of fractals and a proof of the four color theorem in 1976.

Physics 
 New areas of physics, like special relativity, general relativity, and quantum mechanics, were developed during the first half of the century. In the process, the internal structure of atoms came to be clearly understood, followed by the discovery of elementary particles.
 It was found that all the known forces can be traced to only four fundamental interactions. It was discovered further that two forces, electromagnetism and weak interaction, can be merged in the electroweak interaction, leaving only three different fundamental interactions.
 Discovery of nuclear reactions, in particular nuclear fusion, finally revealed the source of solar energy.
 Radiocarbon dating was invented, and became a powerful technique for determining the age of prehistoric animals and plants as well as historical objects.

Astronomy 
 A much better understanding of the evolution of the universe was achieved, its age (about 13.8 billion years) was determined, and the Big Bang theory on its origin was proposed and generally accepted.
 The age of the Solar System, including Earth, was determined, and it turned out to be much older than believed earlier: more than 4 billion years, rather than the 20 million years suggested by Lord Kelvin in 1862.
 The planets of the Solar System and their moons were closely observed via numerous space probes. Pluto was discovered in 1930 on the edge of the solar system, although in the early 21st century, it was reclassified as a dwarf planet instead of a planet proper, leaving eight planets.
 No trace of life was discovered on any of the other planets orbiting the Sun (or elsewhere in the universe), although it remained undetermined whether some forms of primitive life might exist, or might have existed, somewhere in the Solar System. Extrasolar planets were observed for the first time.

Agriculture 

Norman Borlaug fathered the Green Revolution, the set of research technology transfer initiatives occurring between 1950 and the late 1960s that increased agricultural production in parts of the world, beginning most markedly in the late 1960s, and is often credited with saving over a billion people worldwide from starvation.

Biology 
 Genetics was unanimously accepted and significantly developed. The structure of DNA was determined in 1953 by James Watson, Francis Crick, Rosalind Franklin and Maurice Wilkins, following by developing techniques which allow to read DNA sequences and culminating in starting the Human Genome Project (not finished in the 20th century) and cloning the first mammal in 1996.
 The role of sexual reproduction in evolution was understood, and bacterial conjugation was discovered.
 The convergence of various sciences for the formulation of the modern evolutionary synthesis (produced between 1936 and 1947), providing a widely accepted account of evolution.

Medicine 

 Placebo-controlled, randomized, blinded clinical trials became a powerful tool for testing new medicines.
 Antibiotics drastically reduced mortality from bacterial diseases.
 A vaccine was developed for polio, ending a worldwide epidemic. Effective vaccines were also developed for a number of other serious infectious diseases, including influenza, diphtheria, pertussis (whooping cough), tetanus, measles, mumps, rubella (German measles), chickenpox, hepatitis A, and hepatitis B.
 Epidemiology and vaccination led to the eradication of the smallpox virus in humans.
 X-rays became a powerful diagnostic tool for a wide spectrum of diseases, from bone fractures to cancer. In the 1960s, computerized tomography was invented. Other important diagnostic tools developed were sonography and magnetic resonance imaging.
 Development of vitamins virtually eliminated scurvy and other vitamin-deficiency diseases from industrialized societies.
 New psychiatric drugs were developed. These include antipsychotics for treating hallucinations and delusions, and antidepressants for treating depression.
 The role of tobacco smoking in the causation of cancer and other diseases was proven during the 1950s (see British Doctors Study).
 New methods for cancer treatment, including chemotherapy, radiation therapy, and immunotherapy, were developed. As a result, cancer could often be cured or placed in remission.
 The development of blood typing and blood banking made blood transfusion safe and widely available.
 The invention and development of immunosuppressive drugs and tissue typing made organ and tissue transplantation a clinical reality.
 New methods for heart surgery were developed, including pacemakers and artificial hearts.
 Cocaine and heroin were widely illegalized after being found to be addictive and destructive. Psychoactive drugs such as LSD and MDMA were discovered and subsequently prohibited in many countries. Prohibition of drugs caused a growth in the black market drug industry, and expanded enforcement led to a larger prison population in some countries.
 Contraceptive drugs were developed, which reduced population growth rates in industrialized countries, as well as decreased the taboo of premarital sex throughout many western countries.
 The development of medical insulin during the 1920s helped raise the life expectancy of diabetics to three times of what it had been earlier.
 Vaccines, hygiene and clean water improved health and decreased mortality rates, especially among infants and the young.

Notable diseases 
 An influenza pandemic, Spanish Flu, killed anywhere from 17 to 100 million people between 1918 and 1919.
 A new viral disease, called the Human Immunodeficiency Virus, or HIV, arose in Africa and subsequently killed millions of people throughout the world. HIV leads to a syndrome called Acquired Immunodeficiency Syndrome, or AIDS. Treatments for HIV remained inaccessible to many people living with AIDS and HIV in developing countries, and a cure has yet to be discovered.
 Because of increased life spans, the prevalence of cancer, Alzheimer's disease, Parkinson's disease, and other diseases of old age increased slightly.
 Changes in food production, along with sedentary lifestyles due to labor-saving devices and the increase in home entertainment, contributed to an "epidemic" of obesity, at first in the rich countries, but by the end of the 20th century spreading to the developing world.

Energy and the environment 

 Fossil fuels and nuclear power were the dominant forms of energy sources.
 Widespread use of petroleum in industry—both as a chemical precursor to plastics and as a fuel for the automobile and airplane—led to the geopolitical importance of petroleum resources. The Middle East, home to many of the world's oil deposits, became a center of geopolitical and military tension throughout the latter half of the century. (For example, oil was a factor in Japan's decision to go to war against the United States in 1941, and the oil cartel, OPEC, used an oil embargo of sorts in the wake of the Yom Kippur War in the 1970s).
 The increase in fossil fuel consumption also fueled a major scientific controversy over its effect on air pollution, global warming, and global climate change.
 Pesticides, herbicides and other toxic chemicals accumulated in the environment, including in the bodies of humans and other animals.
 Population growth and worldwide deforestation diminished the quality of the environment.
 In the last third of the century, concern about humankind's impact on the Earth's environment made environmentalism popular. In many countries, especially in Europe, the movement was channeled into politics through Green parties. Increasing awareness of global warming began in the 1980s, commencing decades of social and political debate.

Engineering and technology 

One of the prominent traits of the 20th century was the dramatic growth of technology. Organized research and practice of science led to advancement in the fields of communication, electronics, engineering, travel, medicine, and war.
 Basic home appliances including washing machines, clothes dryers, furnaces, exercise machines, dishwashers, refrigerators, freezers, electric stoves and vacuum cleaners became popular from the 1920s through the 1950s. Radios were popularized as a form of entertainment during the 1920s, followed by television during the 1950s.
 The first airplane, the Wright Flyer, was flown in 1903. With the engineering of the faster jet engine in the 1940s, mass air travel became commercially viable.
 The assembly line made mass production of the automobile viable. By the end of the 20th century, billions of people had automobiles for personal transportation. The combination of the automobile, motor boats and air travel allowed for unprecedented personal mobility. In western nations, motor vehicle accidents became the greatest cause of death for young people. However, expansion of divided highways reduced the death rate.
 The triode tube was invented.
Air conditioning of buildings became common
 New materials, most notably stainless steel, Velcro, silicone, teflon, and plastics such as polystyrene, PVC, polyethylene, and nylon came into widespread use for many various applications. These materials typically have tremendous performance gains in strength, temperature, chemical resistance, or mechanical properties over those known prior to the 20th century.
 Aluminum became an inexpensive metal and became second only to iron in use.
 Thousands of chemicals were developed for industrial processing and home use.
 Digital computers came into use

Space exploration 

 The Space Race between the United States and the Soviet Union gave a peaceful outlet to the political and military tensions of the Cold War, leading to the first human spaceflight with the Soviet Union's Vostok 1 mission in 1961, and man's first landing on another world—the Moon—with America's Apollo 11 mission in 1969. Later, the first space station was launched by the Soviet space program. The United States developed the first reusable spacecraft system with the Space Shuttle program, first launched in 1981. As the century ended, a permanent manned presence in space was being founded with the ongoing construction of the International Space Station.
 In addition to human spaceflight, unmanned space probes became a practical and relatively inexpensive form of exploration. The first orbiting space probe, Sputnik 1, was launched by the Soviet Union in 1957. Over time, a massive system of artificial satellites was placed into orbit around Earth. These satellites greatly advanced navigation, communications, military intelligence, geology, climate, and numerous other fields. Also, by the end of the 20th century, unmanned probes had visited or flew by the Moon, Mercury, Venus, Mars, Jupiter, Saturn, Uranus, Neptune, and various asteroids and comets, with Voyager 1 being the farthest man made object from Earth at 23,5 billion kilometers away from Earth as of 6 September 2022, and together with Voyager 2 both carrying The Voyager Golden Record containing sounds, music and greetings in 55 languages as well as 116 images of nature, human advancement, space and society.            
 The Hubble Space Telescope, launched in 1990, greatly expanded our understanding of the Universe and brought brilliant images to TV and computer screens around the world.
 The Global Positioning System, a series of satellites that allow land-based receivers to determine their exact location, was developed and deployed.

Religion 

 1900s – A number of related revival movements mark the start of Pentecostalism.
 1904 — Aleister Crowley dictates The Book of the Law, the foundational text of Thelema.
 1922 – The Soviet Union establishes a doctrine of state atheism.
 1930 — Wallace Fard Muhammad founds the Nation of Islam. The Seventh Lambeth Conference allows for the possibility of birth control within Anglicanism, the first example of a modern Christian church supporting such a position.
 1940s — Wicca is formalized by Gerald Gardner and Doreen Valiente.
 1950s — Sayyid Qutb articulates Qutbism, a violent variety of Islamism that would later become foundational to jihadist ideology. Maharishi Mahesh Yogi begins to teach Transcendental Meditation.
 1953 — L. Ron Hubbard founds the Church of Scientology, which has a unique cosmology based on science fiction and his older system of Dianetics.
 1956 — B. R. Ambedkar launches the Dalit Buddhist movement.
 1960 – The charismatic movement starts within Anglicanism, quickly spreading to other Christian sects.
 1962–65 – The Second Vatican Council is held, resulting in significant changes in the Catholic Church.
 1970s — New Age beliefs and practices are popularized.
 1979 – In Shia Islam, the Islamic Revolution establishes a theocratic state within Iran.
 1988 — Al-Qaeda, a network of Islamic extremists, is founded among Arab members of the Afghan mujahideen. It engages in a number of terror attacks throughout the 1990s, leading up to the September 11 attacks in 2001.
 1999 — Falun Gong, a Chinese new religious movement dating to the early 1990s, begins to be persecuted by the Chinese government.

Economics 
 The Great Depression was a worldwide economic slowdown that lasted throughout the early 1930s.
 The Soviet Union implemented a series of five-year plans for industrialization and economic development.
 Most countries abandoned the gold standard for their currency. The Bretton Woods system involved currencies being pegged to the United States dollar; after the system collapsed in 1971 most major currencies had a floating exchange rate.
 The 1970s energy crisis occurred when the Western world, particularly the United States, Canada, Western Europe, Australia, and New Zealand, faced substantial petroleum shortages as well as elevated prices. The two worst crises of this period were the 1973 oil crisis and the 1979 energy crisis, when, respectively, the Yom Kippur War and the Iranian Revolution triggered interruptions in Middle Eastern oil exports.

See also 

 20th-century inventions
 Death rates in the 20th century
 Infectious disease in the 20th century
 Modern art
 Short twentieth century
 Timelines of modern history
 List of 20th-century women artists
 List of notable 20th-century writers
 List of 20th-century American writers by birth year
 List of battles 1901–2000
 List of stories set in a future now past

References

Sources
 . Climate Change 2013 Working Group 1 website.
 

Further reading 
 Brower, Daniel R. and Thomas Sanders. The World in the Twentieth Century (7th Ed, 2013)
 CBS News. People of the century. Simon and Schuster, 1999. 
 Grenville, J. A. S. A History of the World in the Twentieth Century (1994). online free
 Hallock, Stephanie A. The World in the 20th Century: A Thematic Approach (2012)
 Langer, William. An Encyclopedia of World History (5th ed. 1973); highly detailed outline of events online free
 Morris, Richard B. and Graham W. Irwin, eds. Harper Encyclopedia of the Modern World: A Concise Reference History from 1760 to the Present (1970) online
 Pindyck, Robert S. "What we know and don’t know about climate change, and implications for policy." Environmental and Energy Policy and the Economy 2.1 (2021): 4–43. online
 Pollard, Sidney, ed. Wealth and Poverty: an Economic History of the 20th Century (1990), 260 pp; global perspective online free
 Stearns, Peter, ed. The Encyclopedia of World History (2001)

External links

 The 20th Century Research Project (archived 26 February 2012)
 Slouching Towards Utopia: The Economic History of the Twentieth Century (archived 6 February 2012)
 Discovering Literature: 20th century at the British Library

 
2nd millennium
Centuries
Late modern period